Gore Canyon, elevation , is a short isolated canyon on the upper Colorado River in southwestern Grand County, Colorado in the United States. Steep and rugged, the approximately 3 mile (5 km) long gorge was carved by the river as it passed the northern end of the Gore Range southwest of Kremmling. The canyon effectively marks the southwestern end of the Middle Park basin in north-central Colorado.

Accessibility
The canyon is roadless and inaccessible by most traffic, except for the Union Pacific Railroad's Moffat Subdivision and whitewater boats.  Despite the short length, the canyon presented a formidable obstacle for the railroad, and the building of the line through it was considered a monumental engineering achievement in its day. Although the canyon is not directly accessible by roads, it is possible to view part of the canyon from the Grand County road (CR 1, or Trough Road) that passes along its southern rim, as part of the Colorado River Headwaters National Scenic Byway. The California Zephyr also travels through the canyon.

Whitewater
Gore Canyon is also famous for its wild class V whitewater.  "Captain" Samuel Adams considered it unnavigable by boat during his expedition in the 19th century.  The construction of the railroad has added boulders and other hazards that have since made the river even more difficult.

Today, expert kayakers and rafters frequent the canyon, and now even hold a river festival including races and other river celebrations.The Gore Canyon Whitewater Festival is held every year on the third Saturday of August and is also the host of the US National White Water Rafting Championship.  Gore Canyon was first rafted in the 1970s, and now is even available as a commercial river raft trip. Historically the canyon has been run commercially by multiple companies including Timberline adventures, Arkansas Valley Adventure(AVA), and Liquid Descent. Currently the canyon is run commercially by Liquid Descent. Most outfitters agree that Gore Canyon's whitewater is the wildest commercially available whitewater rafting in the state of Colorado, and perhaps in the nation.  Those who are brave enough to raft or kayak Gore Canyon will run rapids such as Gore Rapid, Pyrite, and Tunnel Falls.  This is true wild water, so for those who are not expert river runners, Gore Canyon is considered a very dangerous section of the Colorado River.

Rapids
Gore canyon features 5 class V rapids and a myriad of class III-IV rapids.

All lines and info provided by a 2nd year river guide who has never actually guided gore. Do not use this as a guide.

Fisherman’s Nightmare. (III)

The first rapid encountered is named Fisherman’s Nightmare, a long class three that is easily manageable by a whitewater boat or kayaker, but could spell disaster for the unaware Fisherman, hence the name. 

Applesauce. (IV+)

Next rapid is named Applesauce, roughly a 16 foot drop featuring a clamshell rock center left that is best to be avoided. This rapid is followed by a large pool and a section of calm water.

Gore Rapid. (V)

Gore rapid is likely the most intense and consequential. Commercial boaters will pull over after the large rock and portage their boat until they reach lower gore rapid. Upper gore rapid features a series of moves where the boaters must stay above the main hole named Ginger, then stay right past Indecision Rock and continue on to Lower Gore Rapid. For kayakers and smaller crafts there is an alternate line staying left of Ginger. Lower Gore is a simple move from the portage Eddie, where boaters start river right and work across to the next Eddie on river left.

Scissors. (V)

Scissors is an extremely difficult rapid, requiring immense precision for the first move, and having severe consequences for mistakes. After catching the Eddie past lower gore, boaters must drive into the middle of the river aiming the right side of their boat at a rock sticking out, hoping to reach river right and catching a small Eddie, where you must ferry upstream to ensure you get around rodeo rock. Eddie out river left.

Pyrite. (V) 

You begin from river left, and follow the current until it starts to curve left. The typical line you want to kiss the small eddie and have it pull you to the left and then go down a ~10 foot drop. The race line is simpler yet has higher consequences, where instead of kissing the eddie you follow the main current, going down a violent drop slightly larger than the main line. 

Coffin. (IV)

This rapid involves some simple but critical moves as there is a large undercut rock at the middle of this rapid. First boaters swing right to catch helicopter eddie, then must back ferry across river left to ensure they stay away from the sieve.

Lily Launch Pad. (IV)  

Fun long wave train, stay center left and smash the last wave! Keep it straight.  

Left-Right-Center. (IV)

Rather simple rapid, 3 possible lines. Take a wild guess what they are. Center is often considered the easiest line. Right then starts right then drops down to the left. Left is the most violent featuring a rock to the left at the drop that is certainly best to avoid.

Hawaii five-o/Preminition. (IV) 

Another fun wave train, featuring a large lateral at the bottom featuring a large drop. Incredibly fun, best hit on the run. Eddie out river right. 

Tunnel Falls. (V)  

Certainly the most talked about and filmed rapid in Gore canyon. Start in the Eddie on river right and work left, following around a S turn move leading to the falls. Ensure you are river center otherwise you will hit some nasty rocks sending you flying into the hole below. As the boat goes over the drop, taking a large breath in is heavily recommended. Boats most commonly will completely submerge and the left side will pop up first, where most paddlers will fall out to the right. Boats will often flip in this location as well. If hit at an awkward angle, the boat can easily get spun left and bucked, sending paddlers into the curtain of the pour over. At lower water, <1000cfs, this hole is very retentive and dangerous. 2 large Eddies to river right that should be easy for any decent swimmer to catch. 

The Island. (IV)

Likely the most underrated feature as most river runners are now thinking about the next rapid, this rapid features a few rock dodging moves in quick succession then going left through a small rock slot. Eddie out river left.

Toilet Bowl. (IV+) 

Simplest yet possibly the most dangerous rapid in Gore Canyon. Toilet bowl features a single drop that is ~9 feet. The drop creates a smooth pour over, much like a low head dam creating a perfectly recirculating hole. Heavy rafts rarely get caught up, but smaller boats and kayakers be weary! Paddle hard and paddle through the drop. If surfed either abandon ship downriver or devote your life to the river gods. Follow the river around a corner and Eddie out river left at party beach.

Kirschbaum. (V)

Last and Longest Class V in the canyon. Begin from party beach river left and rock dodge through the first set of boulders. Then work right for the first major feature, the Goalposts. There’s a shallow pour over above it river right very close to the shore, can be used to slow down and set up. Drive from right to left. Most often the left goalpost is hit then the boat gets knocked to the right rock. Get ready to high-side! Next around a large rock then you encounter the next major feature, The Thing. This is a massive pour over that continues to grow as water levels rise, most likely the most violent hit in the canyon if hit directly. To avoid it go either right or left. Eddies river left for safety or continue river center/left to finish the rapid.

Happy Ending. (III) 

Following a few sections of flat water and Class IIs, the last named rapid in gore canyon features rock dodging then a wave train river right. About 3 more miles of flat water and you will reach Upper Pump-house Recreation area. Time for beer and Fajitas! Happy Rafting!

Wildlife
The canyon is home to pronghorn, bald eagles, and the Colorado River hosts varieties of trout. In 2009, a small herd of bighorn sheep were released in Gore Canyon by the Colorado Parks and Wildlife. This added to an existing herd to help boost the population after declines due to competition with domestic animals, hunting, and disease.

External links

American Whitewater's Gore Canyon page

References 

Canyons and gorges of Colorado
Landforms of Grand County, Colorado
Colorado River